BQE or bqe may stand for:

 Brooklyn–Queens Expressway
 The BQE (soundtrack)
 ISO 639-3 code Navarro-Lapurdian dialect.
 IATA code Bubaque Airport